Chuángshén (床神 "Bed God") is the Chinese deity of the bedchamber. It articulates in a couple of male and female deities: Chuángmǔ (床母 "Bed Mother") and her husband, Chuánggōng (床公 "Bed Lord").

They look after the bedroom in all aspects, including sleep, sex, childbirth, recovery from illness, and rest.

References

Chinese deities
Taiwanese folk religion